Luna Sea 3D in Los Angeles is a live album, 3D concert film and home video by Japanese rock band Luna Sea. It was recorded and filmed at the Hollywood Palladium in the United States on December 4, 2010, as part of their 20th Anniversary World Tour Reboot -to the New Moon-. The live album was released on June 1, 2011, while the film began showing in theaters nationwide on June 4, 2011 and was released on home video on February 22, 2012. The album reached number 15 on the Oricon Albums Chart, the Blu-ray reached number 48 on Oricon's Blu-ray chart, and the DVD version peaked at number 67.

Recording and release
Luna Sea 3D in Los Angeles was filmed in 3-D at the Hollywood Palladium in Hollywood, California on December 4, 2010. The concert was the second date of the band's first world tour, 20th Anniversary World Tour Reboot -to the New Moon-, and marked their first ever concert in the United States. Having reunited earlier that year after disbanding in 2000, the tour was also their first in ten years.

The film had its premiere at Toho Cinemas Roppongi Hills on May 29, 2011 and entered Japanese theaters nationwide on June 4. The live album, their first since Never Sold Out 12 years earlier, was released on June 1, 2011. The album reached number 15 on the Oricon Albums Chart and charted for three weeks. The film was later released on DVD, Blu-ray and 3D Blu-ray on February 22, 2012. The Blu-ray version reached number 48 on Oricon's Blu-ray chart, while the DVD version peaked at number 67 on Oricon's DVD chart.

The songs "Face to Face", "Fate" and "In My Dream (With Shiver)" and the bass and drum solos performed at the concert are not included on any release. The performance of "Gravity" is included on the album, but not in the film.

Live album track listing

References

External links
 
 

Luna Sea albums
2011 live albums
Japanese musical films
Live video albums
Concert films
2011 3D films
Films shot in Los Angeles
3D concert films